Cristóbal Olemdo León Lozano is the third bishop of the Episcopal Diocese of Litoral Ecuador. He was elected on August 4, 2018 to succeed Alfredo Morante España. He was consecrated by Presiding Bishop Michael Curry on March 30, 2019 at the Philanthropic Society in Guayaquil and installed the next day at Cathedral Church of Christ the King in Guayaquil.

He was ordained to the priesthood on March 22, 1998 and served as archdeacon of Manabí prior to being elected bishop.

See also 

 Historical list of the Episcopal bishops of the United States

References 

Ecuadorian clergy
Living people
20th-century births
Year of birth missing (living people)
Anglican bishops in South America